Soltero is the musical project of songwriter Tim Howard. Howard started performing as Soltero while living in Boston. He currently resides in Brooklyn, NY.

Production history

Howard started playing music while attending Wesleyan as a film major in the late 1990s. 
Soltero has had several incarnations, including a five-piece band (with trumpet and Rhodes piano) and a four-piece band, as well as solo and duo acoustic lineups. The first full-length Soltero album, entitled Science Will Figure You Out, was recorded with members of the Mobius Band and self-released in August 2001. April 2003 saw the release of Defrocked and Kicking the Habit on Handsome Records. The Tongues You Have Tied. an album recorded winter 2003/04 on reel-to-reel 8-track, was put out on Three Ring Records in June 2004. Soltero's 2005 album, Hell Train, was the first to prominently feature his live band of three years. It was first self-released in March, and then released more widely by Three Ring Records in November 2005. Soltero's fifth record, You're No Dream, found Howard returning to the solo recording dynamic of earlier work. Recorded in Philadelphia using an array of borrowed instruments, the album was released in 2008. The band's sixth album, 1943, was recorded at Junxt Studio in Brooklyn and was selected by French production company Microcultures as a featured project for release in late 2011.

Career history
Tim Howard graduated from Wesleyan University CT in 2000. During a trip through Latin America in 2009, he decided to pursue a career in public radio. He applied for an internship at Radiolab and began working there in part because producer Lulu Miller was a fan of his music. Howard currently works for the Gimlet Media podcast Reply All and continues to write and record music in his spare time. Sometimes Howard's two careers overlap, like when Soltero's cover of Creedence Clearwater Revival's "Green River" was used in Radiolab's 2012 "Colors" episode.

Discography

Albums
 Science Will Figure You Out (2001)
 Defrocked and Kicking the Habit (2003)
 The Tongues You Have Tied (2004)
 Hell Train (2005)
 You're No Dream (2008 on La Société Expéditionnaire in the US and Messie Murders in France)
 1943 (2012, on Microcultures in Europe, self-released through Bandcamp in the US.)
 Jamming the Gaydar (2013)
 Western Medicine Blues (2017)

Collections
 Best Hits (self-released, 2013, compiles tracks from Soltero's first six albums)

References

External links
 Soltero's Official Page
 Soltero homepage for music, links, and info
 Soltero's Bandcamp Page
 Microcultures Project Page
 Soltero's Myspace Page
 A Guide to the Music of Soltero

Alternative rock groups from Massachusetts
American radio producers
Indie rock musical groups from Massachusetts
Musical groups established in 2001
Wesleyan University alumni